William Hibbert may refer to:
William Hibbert (cricketer)
William Hibbert (planter)